The Pechell, later Brooke-Pechell, later Pechell Baronetcy, of Paglesham in the County of Essex, was a title in the Baronetage of Great Britain. It was created on 1 March 1797 for Lieutenant-Colonel Paul Pechell, a retired army officer whose father was of noble Huguenot descent. The second baronet, whose mother was the only daughter and heir of Thomas Brooke of Paglesham, Essex, took by royal licence the additional surname of Brooke. The first and second baronets were army officers, the third and fourth rose to flag rank in the Royal Navy, and the second through fourth baronets were also Member of Parliament.

The seventh Baronet was a qualified doctor and surgeon and served as a lieutenant-colonel with the Royal Army Medical Corps and later at the Royal Hospital Chelsea.

The eighth baronet served as a major with the Essex Regiment and was awarded the Military Cross for gallantry during the Great War.

The eighth and ninth Baronets used the surname Pechell only. On the death of the ninth Baronet on 29 January 1984 the baronetcy became extinct.

Pechell, later Brooke-Pechell, later Pechell baronets, of Paglesham (1797)
Sir Paul Pechell, 1st Baronet (1724–1800)
Sir Thomas Brooke-Pechell, 2nd Baronet (1753–1826)
Sir Samuel John Brooke-Pechell, 3rd Baronet (1785–1849)
Sir George Richard Brooke-Pechell, 4th Baronet (1789–1860)
Sir George Samuel Brooke-Pechell, 5th Baronet (1819–1897)
Sir Samuel George Brooke-Pechell, 6th Baronet (1852–1904)
Sir Augustus Alexander Brooke-Pechell, 7th Baronet (1857–1937)
Sir Paul Pechell, 8th Baronet (1889–1972)
Sir Ronald Horace Pechell, 9th Baronet (1918–1984)

References

Extinct baronetcies in the Baronetage of Great Britain